Rudbarak-e Pain (also Romanized as Rūdbārak-e Pā’īn) is a village in Poshtkuh Rural District, Shahmirzad District, Mehdishahr County, Semnan Province, Iran. At the 2006 census, its population was 18, in 12 families.

Together with the nearby village of Rudbarak-e Bala, the village hosts the National Festival of Iranian Traditions and Folk Games.

References 

Populated places in Mehdishahr County